"Salvation" is a song recorded by Slovenian singer-songwriter ManuElla and the follow-up to her Eurovision Song Contest entry "Blue and Red". It was written by Maja Keuc, Marjan Hvala and Manuella Brečko. The track was released on February 24, 2017, as a stand-alone single, and was performed for the first time at EMA 2017, in which ManuElla had a guest slot. Backed by an instrumentation of guitars and drums, the country-pop track has feel-good and inspirational lyrics.

Commercial performance 
Although the song didn't impact any official chart, 'Salvation' performed well on streaming services, especially Spotify. Due to its high streams, the song is currently the highest streamed non-Eurovision single by a Slovenian solo artist.

Critical reception 
The track received generally favourable reviews from critics. Wiwibloggs described the song as 'refreshing and current' and that it sounds like a continuation of her previous single "Blue and Red". Eurovision Australia expressed their fondness of the track and called it 'energetic' and ManuElla's vocals were complemented.

References 

2017 singles